As of September 2020, TUI fly Netherlands operates to the following destinations:

References

External links 
 Official website

Lists of airline destinations